José Terrón Peñaranda (5 July 1939 – 12 May 2019) was a Spanish film actor. He played Guy Callaway in For a Few Dollars More (1965), and Thomas 'Shorty' Larson in The Good, the Bad and the Ugly (1966).

Terrón died on 12 May 2019 in Benidorm at the age of 79 from an illness.

Filmography
 El Cid (1961) as Soldier (uncredited)
 The Fall of the Roman Empire (1964) as Soldier on a horse (uncredited)
 Circus World (1964) as Circus rider (uncredited)
 For a Few Dollars More (1965) as Guy Calloway, Mortimer's 1st Criminal (uncredited)
 Django (1966) as Ringo – Klan Member with Scar (uncredited)
 Man from Nowhere (1966) as Watch Henchman (uncredited)
 Navajo Joe (1966) as Soldier (uncredited)
 The Good, the Bad and the Ugly (1966) as Thomas 'Shorty' Larson (uncredited)
 Death Rides a Horse (1967) as Complice di Walcott (uncredited)
 God Forgives... I Don't! (1967) as 'Flatface' – San Antonio Henchman (uncredited)
 15 Scaffolds for a Murderer (1967) as Hangman (uncredited)
 I Want Him Dead (1968) as Logan – Cowboy Drinking at Saloon (uncredited)
 White Comanche as (1968) Comanche / Townsman (uncredited)
 Shalako (1968) as Indian (uncredited)
 Gunman of Ave Maria (1969) as Francisco Henchman (uncredited)
 The Devil's Backbone (1971) as Apache (uncredited) (final film role)

References

External links
 

1939 births
2019 deaths
20th-century Spanish male actors
Male actors from Madrid
Male Spaghetti Western actors
Spanish male film actors